The Declaration is a young adult novel by Gemma Malley.

First published in 2008, it is the first book in a trilogy. It takes place in a dystopian reality in the 22nd century in which humanity has cured all illness and aspires to eternal life. It was followed by The Resistance (2009) and The Legacy (2010).

Plot

Anna Covey is nearly 15 years old and has lived in Grange Hall (a Surplus Hall) for most of her life. She was taken away from her parents at the age of two and now, in the year 2140, she has learned to "hate [her] parents"  for bringing her into the world. Anna has also grown up believing that her parents hate her because it is her fault they are imprisoned.

As part of her Pending process (through which she will become a Valuable Asset the moment she comes of age), Anna undergoes a work placement in the home of a Legal lady, Mrs Sharpe, who is kind to her in a way Anna is not used to. Mrs Sharpe allows Anna to take certain liberties that would earn her a beating if discovered by the staff at Grange Hall, like offering  for Anna to try on her lipstick. At the end of the placement, Mrs Sharpe gives Anna a small diary made of pink suede, in which Anna writes every night. However, as "journals and writing [are] forbidden at Grange hall [because] Surpluses were not there to read and write [but] to learn and work", Anna has to hide her diary on a secret shelf in the side of the girls' bath.

The arrival of a new Surplus at Grange Hall, Peter, begins as just another chore for Anna. As one of the House Matron's most trusted Prefects, she is instructed to make up his bed and leave his supplies waiting for him. She thinks no more of Peter until he starts to cause problems for her. He tells dangerous stories about the world outside Grange Hall, and calls her "Anna Covey", which he says is the name given to her by her parents. Peter tells Anna that her parents love her, and that they asked him to be captured so that he would be able to bring her home to them. Anna disregards everything that Peter says. She sees him as a troublemaker and believes things would be simpler if Peter would come to terms with his debt to Mother Nature.

Peter begins to get inside Anna's head when Anna is beaten savagely by Mrs Pincent. She overhears Mrs Pincent talking about how she has become 'brainwashed' and realizes that the House Matron does not care for her. She is not a Valuable Asset, and life in Grange Hall becomes meaningless. In the same conversation, Anna learns of a plot to kill Peter, who is still having difficulty settling into Grange Hall life. She purposely misbehaves and gets herself put into Solitary so she may communicate with Peter, and the two form the plan to escape "through a tunnel in Solitary," which they very narrowly manage to execute.

On the run from Grange Hall, the children seek shelter in the garden shed of Julia Sharpe, the Legal who Anna served on her placement. Julia is frightened to discover Anna and Peter, but reluctantly harbors them and feigns ignorance when the search party comes to her door. Mrs Sharpe helps Anna and Peter get out of the village and drives them to the outskirts of London. Later, however, she is pressured into giving them up to the Catchers.

Upon arrival at her parents' house in Bloomsbury, Anna realises that Peter has been entirely truthful in his stories of her parents, and his claims that they love her. Anna's parents have longed for her return. At this point, Anna discovers she has a younger brother named Ben, who is still an infant. She is overwhelmed with love for her family after her upbringing in the frigid sterility of Grange Hall.

When the children are discovered hiding beneath the floorboards by the authorities, whose search for the missing Surpluses leads them to the Coveys' door, Anna's parents commit suicide. There is a clause of The Declaration which explains that if a Surplus loses a parent then they become Legal. The two deaths mean that neither Ben nor Anna is a Surplus any longer. Shortly afterwards, Peter is informed by his grandfather (Richard Pincent) that his father has been killed by his mother, Margaret Pincent (the matron of Grange Hall), and that he is also now a Legal.

In the book's conclusion, Peter and Anna live together in her parents’ house. They decide to raise Ben, Anna's brother, as their own child. All three are now Legals, and they begin a life of freedom outside of Grange Hall.

Major characters

 Anna Covey – Anna is the protagonist of the first book in the series. She was found by Catchers around the age of 2 and has lived in Grange Hall ever since. She is a Pending and thus belongs to the oldest group of Surplus "educated" at Grange Hall. (The younger Surplus are "Smalls" and "Middles") As a Prefect she has special privileges like a second blanket and bigger servings at certain meals. Anna is indoctrinated to believe that her parents were evil and that she has to be punished for their sins. Her last name is "Covey" as she learns when Peter arrives, before she is referred to simply as "Surplus Anna".
 Peter Bunting/Pincent – Peter arrives at Grange Hall when he has already reached the age of a Pending. He is insolent and does not believe that Surplus are ruining things for everybody else. By his own claim, Peter only came to rescue Anna and is sent by her parents to do so. When he was a child, Peter was found by members of the Underground Movement.
 Margaret Pincent – House Matron of Grange Hall. She is a bitter and cruel woman and also "the daughter of the chairman of the biggest Longevity drug company". During the course of the novel, it is revealed that she is the mother of Peter, but had thought him dead.
 Sheila – One of Anna's fellow Surplus. She believes that she belongs in the Outside world, as her parents were Opt Outs and she is, thus, Legal. Mrs Pincent notes that "Sheila's imagination is far too active."  She is something like a friend to Anna, but Anna mostly deems her a useless Surplus and Sheila aids in the capture of Anna and Peter later in the novel.
 Julia Sharpe – A Legal who lives in the village close to Grange Hall. When Anna works for her for some time, she only shows her kindness. Later Mrs Sharpe helps Anna and Peter hide from the Catchers.
 Anna's parents

Background

In the year 2030, a scientist creates Longevity, a drug which prevents death from old age, but does not entirely halt the aging process. People continue to have children and, as there are no longer any deaths, this quickly leads to overpopulation. As a result, in the year 2065, the Declaration is introduced. This is a document which must be signed before an individual is allowed to take Longevity, and in doing so they agree not to have any children. In practice, this is not strictly upheld and some wealthy and powerful people have ways to take the drug and still have children.

Many people resist the Declaration. They still want to have families, but are unwilling to give up the chance to live indefinitely. Children born to those who have not opted out are referred to as "Surplus". In some countries, Surpluses are killed at once, but in others, such as Britain, they are taken from their parents at birth to live in "Surplus Halls". They are taught that their existence is a crime against Nature, and that the only way they can atone for their parents' sins is through hard and constant labour. Obedient Surpluses can rise through the ranks at Grange Hall to become a "Valuable Asset." Valuable Assets are allowed to go and work as servants in the homes of Legals (people who are not Surpluses).

Reception

Reviewing the book in The Guardian, Diane Samuels criticized the writing, describing it as "prosaic" and "resorting to passages that tell the reader how it is rather than allowing the characters to live and breathe." She found it emotionally shallow and politically simplistic, saying: "More complexity is needed to grapple meaningfully with the psychological impact of such a profound alienation between adults and children." Nicolette Jones, writing in the Sunday Times, was more positive, describing the book as a "fine debut" and "convincing."

The series is part of a larger trend of dystopian young adult literature, and has attracted scholarly attention. Susan Louise Stewart identifies a broad theme of futuristic Holocausts, drawing parallels from Malley's books to Lois Lowry's The Giver, Neal Shusterman's Unwind, and Suzanne Collins's The Hunger Games. Jennifer Ford identifies a similar theme of overpopulation motifs in young adult books, including the Declaration trilogy.

References

External links
 Author website
 Gemma Malley discusses The Declaration on YouTube
 The Declaration OpenISBN Project

2008 British novels
Novels set in the 22nd century
British young adult novels
Bloomsbury Publishing books